John Peder Ditlev-Simonsen (18 October 1898 – 10 January 2001) was a Norwegian sailor who competed in the 1936 Summer Olympics. In 1936 he won the silver medal as crew member of the Norwegian boat Silja in the 8 metre class event.

During the Second World War Ditlev-Simonsen was amongst a number of prominent Norwegians arrested as hostages by the Germans during their occupation of Norway. Following his arrest on 26 April 1943 he was transferred to Grini concentration camp two days later and given prisoner number 7449, being released on 5 May 1945. His brother Olaf was also arrested and held as a hostage by the Germans.

References

External links
 
 

1898 births
2001 deaths
Grini concentration camp survivors
Medalists at the 1936 Summer Olympics
Norwegian bandy players
Norwegian centenarians
Norwegian male sailors (sport)
Olympic medalists in sailing
Olympic sailors of Norway
Olympic silver medalists for Norway
Sailors at the 1936 Summer Olympics – 8 Metre
Men centenarians
20th-century Norwegian people